Brad Ludden is a professional kayaker born in Sheridan, Wyoming on May 8, 1981. He started kayaking internationally at age 12 and has been to over 40 countries.

He is the founder of a charity called First Descents, an organization that benefits cancer patients. At age 12, Brad learned his aunt was diagnosed with cancer, and shortly after his mother began volunteer work at a local pediatric oncology camp. He volunteered one day each summer, instructing campers on kayaking. This is when he realized he could serve his community while kayaking. In 1999 he began construction of First Descents and in 2001,  construction was finished, with aid from The State of Colorado. 

In 2008 he was named Cosmopolitan Magazine's "Hottest Bachelor in America." Ludden's has also started a blog known as Athletes Giving  where he highlights athletes involved in charitable work. He lives in Kalispell, Montana. he has numerous sponsorship deals, including deals with - Nike, Smith Optics . Dagger Kayaks, Subaru, AT Paddles, Kokatat , and Training Day

Philanthropy
First Descents - Founder

Kayaking Career Competition Results
 3rd Place Cadet Division at the JR Nationals 1994 
 JR National Freestyle Champion 1999 
 3rd Place JR World Freestyle Championships 1997
 1st Place Japan Open 1998 
 3rd Place European Open 1998 
 x Freestyle Athlete of the year, Adventure Quest Kayak Academy 1998, 1999 
 2nd Place JR World Freestyle Championships 1999 
 1st Place Lofer Rodeo Austria 2000 
 Teva Mountain Games medals between 2001 and 2008

References

External links
 Sports Illustrated Adventure "Show Boaters" 
 USA Today First Descents program raises hope for cancer patients 
 Cosmopolitan Magazine's Hottest Bachelor in America 2008 
 Cosmopolitan Being a Cosmo Bachelor: The Play-by-Play 
 Vail Daily 
 Vail Magazine "The Many Dimensions of Brad Ludden 
 Outdoors Fan House 

Kayakers
1981 births
Living people
People from Kalispell, Montana